Shamita Singha is a fashion model, television anchor, animal rights activist, VJ, and beauty pageant from India. She was crowned Femina Miss Earth India 2001 and later competed in the first edition of the international Miss Earth 2001 beauty pageant produced by Carousel Productions, where she was one of the semifinalists.

Career and activism
Singha is a supermodel in India. She modelled for Levis, Electrolux, and Platinum Jewellery. She participated in fashion shows for designers like Manish Malhotra and Ritu Kumar. She was a star in Motorola television commercial with Indian actor and film producer, Abhishek Bachchan.

Singha has supported animal welfare organisations, and is a trustee on the Animal Welfare Board of India
and funds an organisation called Nature and Animal Care Foundation. In a campaign against animal cruelty, Singha posed on a bed of red chillies wearing nothing for PETA Dishoom, the youth division of People for the Ethical Treatment of Animals in India, with the tagline "Spice Up Your Life – Go Vegetarian".

She was on the news in March 2003 when she sat as a judge at a fashion festival in Mumbai. She intervened when she saw a bare-chested model swaggered on to the ramp with a pair of pythons entwined around his neck. She also posed next to a 40-foot killer whale in 2006 for the Kingfisher's Swimsuit Special Calendar 2007.

In August 2004, B4U Music and B4U Movies announced Singha and Sajid Khan
as two new addition to its VJ bandwagon to build up the audience base.

She started to host a daily TV show in 2007 called, Maximum Style designed to connect with the upmarket home-audiences and dealt with ever-fickle fashions, haute lifestyles, fitness, stunning looks, innovative interiors and exotic night-spots to chill out in.

Singha is a wine enthusiast turned wine trainer. She took up introductory & intermediate wine tasting courses and obtained WSET Level 2 certification in wine & spirits. She had her 1st level studies at the Saint Emilion wine tasting school in Bordeaux, France and an introductory course at the Beaune School of Wine in Burgundy. She also attended various wine tasting workshops in Spain as well as in London at the London Wine Academy and special workshops on new world wines in New York & California.

Miss Earth 2001
Singha was selected and crowned Miss Earth India 2001. She went to represent India in the first edition of Miss Earth beauty pageant, where the final coronation night was held on 28 October 2001 at the University of the Philippines Theater in Quezon City, Philippines.

Personal life 
Singha lives in Mumbai, India. She used to date Upen Patel, a British Indian model and Bollywood film actor.

Her sister married to Australian bowler Shaun Tait

External links

References

Living people
Year of birth missing (living people)
Miss Earth India delegates
Indian beauty pageant winners
Female models from Mumbai
Miss Earth 2001 contestants